George K. Haudenshield (June 20, 1920 – February 19, 2011) was a Republican member of the Pennsylvania House of Representatives.

Haudenshield was a dentist, and also served in the United States Navy (1942–1945) during World War II.

References

1920 births
2011 deaths
Republican Party members of the Pennsylvania House of Representatives
American dentists
United States Navy personnel of World War II
People from Carnegie, Pennsylvania
20th-century dentists